Charlotte High School is a secondary school located in Charlotte, Michigan.  It is administered by Charlotte Public Schools.

Notable alumni
Brock Gutierrez, NFL center
For the Fallen Dreams, metalcore band

Athletics
The Orioles compete as members of the Capital Area Activities Conference.  The following MHSAA sanctioned sports are offered:

Baseball (boys)
Basketball (boys & girls)
Bowling (boys & girls)
Competitive cheer (girls) 
Cross country (boys & girls)
Football (boys)
Golf (boys & girls)
Soccer (boys & girls)
Softball (girls)
Swimming and diving (boys & girls)
Tennis (boys & girls)
Track and field (boys & girls)
Volleyball (girls)
Wrestling (boys)

Demographics
There were 872 students enrolled for the 2012–2013 school year.  The demographic breakdown of those students was:

Male = 47.9%
Female = 52.1%
White = 92.6%
Hispanic = 4.4%
Black = 1.4%
Native American = 0.7%
Asian/Pacific islander = 0.6%
Multiracial = 0.3%

References

External links
Charlotte High School website
Charlotte School District

Public high schools in Michigan
Schools in Eaton County, Michigan